Katapult is a free application launcher for the TDE desktop environment. Original development ceased in 2008, but it's been maintained by the TDE developers ever since.

Katapult allows the user to quickly launch applications or open files by pressing Alt + space and typing the beginning of the file or application name. Katapult doubles as a quick calculator, spell checker, and document viewer. Katapult also evaluates expressions (e.g. "5+1"). The solution appears on the right (e.g. "6"). Katapult also features a spell checker that allows the user to verify the spelling of a typed-in word. Katapult file access supports incremental find. The user does not need to type in the entire name of the file to access it, only the first few letters. This feature may also be used to open applications, play songs via Amarok, and in other contexts as well. The Escape key exits Katapult. The Enter key opens applications that are displayed.

Some of the functionality of Katapult has been integrated in the built-in KRunner that ships with KDE Software Compilation 4.

See also

 Comparison of applications launchers
 KDE Plasma Workspaces

References

General References

 Mayank Sharma (July 16, 2007), Katapult yourself to keyboard productivity, linux.com
 Andrew Min (28 May 2007), Launch your programs faster with Katapult, Free Software Magazine column
  Benjamin Mako Hill, Das offizielle Ubuntu Buch, Pearson Education, 2007, p. 252

External links
 Original website (mirror) on the Internet Archive
 Katapult on Kde-Apps
 The Katapult Handbook
 Katapult – KDE application launcher in openSUSE Linux , October 25, 2008, susegeek.com
 Peter Upfold (March 18, 2008) Katapult - a general purpose launcher for KDE, FOSSwire

KDE software
Application launchers

fr:KDE#Applications KDE